Loka is a concept in Hinduism and other Indian religions, that may be translated as a planet, the universe, a plane, or a realm of existence. In some philosophies, it may also be interpreted as a mental state that one can experience. A primary concept in several Indian religions is the idea that different lokas are home to various divine beings, and one takes birth in such realms based on their karma.

Hinduism

Three lokas

The most common classification of lokas in Hinduism is the Trailokya, or the three worlds.

The concept of the three worlds has a number of different interpretations in Hindu cosmology.

In Hindu literature, the three worlds refer to either the earth (Bhuloka), heaven (Svarga), and hell (Naraka), or the earth (Bhuloka), heaven (Svarga), and the netherworld (Patala)

Bhuloka 
In the Narada Purana, Bhuloka is identified with the planet Earth, the world of human beings. It is described to be split up into seven regions, referred to as dvipas (islands). These regions are known as Jambudvipa, Plakshadvipa, Shalmaladvipa, Kushadvipa, Krounchadvipa, Shakadvipa, and Pushkaradvipa. Of special significance is the Indian subcontinent, referred to as Bharatavarsha, which is a land where the fruits of one's actions allows one passage into either Svarga or Naraka. Bhuloka also has seven oceans, namely, Lavana, Ikshu, Sura, Sarpih, Dadhi, Dughdha, and Jala.

Svarga 

Generally translated as heaven, Svarga is identified with the realm of Indra and the devas in contemporary Hinduism. The Vedas offer the reward of Svarga as one's destination for the proper practice of sacrificial rituals on earth. In Vedic mythology, Svarga is filled with the nectar of immortality, amrita, with lakes containing lotuses, pools of wine, milk, and ghee, as well as streams that are replete with honey. It is abundant with food and refreshments, and equal opportunity is offered to all of its denizens. It is described to be an infinite, complete, as well as an immortal realm, offering pleasure to those rare few who are able to ascend to it. It is sometimes associated with Pitṛloka, the realm of one's ancestors, but this association is not present in all literature.

Naraka 

Naraka is generally translated as hell, and refers to the loka that humans are sent to to be punished for their sins. Ruled by Yama, sinners are offered appropriate punishments for their sins on earth, and after a period of time, reborn on earth with bad vipāka, which is the effect of bad karma. The Bhagavata Purana enumerates the following 28 Narakas: Tamisra, Andhatamisra, Raurava, Maharaurava, Kumbhipaka, Kalasutra, Asipatravana, Sukaramukha, Andhakupa, Krimibhojana, Samdamsa, Taptasurmi, Vajrakantaka-salmali, Vaitarani, Puyoda, Pranarodha, Visasana, Lalabhaksa, Sarameyadana, Avichi, Ayahpana, Ksharakardama, Raksogana-bhojana, Sulaprota, Dandasuka, Avata-nirodhana, Paryavartana, and Suchimukha.

The Brahmanda Purana conceives them to be Bhūta (past), Bhavya (future), and Bhavat (present)

The scholar Deborah Soifer describes the development of the concept of lokas as follows:

The concept of a loka or lokas develops in the Vedic literature. Influenced by the special connotations that a word for space might have for a nomadic people, loka in the Veda did not simply mean place or world, but had a positive valuation: it was a place or position of religious or psychological interest with a special value of function of its own. Hence, inherent in the 'loka' concept in the earliest literature was a double aspect; that is, coexistent with spatiality was a religious or soteriological meaning, which could exist independent of a spatial notion, an 'immaterial' significance. The most common cosmological conception of lokas in the Veda was that of the trailokya or triple world: three worlds consisting of earth, atmosphere or sky, and heaven, making up the universe."

Fourteen lokas

In the Puranas and in the Atharvaveda, there are 14 worlds, seven higher ones (Vyahrtis) and seven lower ones (Pātālas), viz.  bhu, bhuvas, svar, mahas, janas, tapas, and satya above and  atala, vitala, sutala, rasātala, talātala, mahātala,  pātāla and naraka at the bottom.  The higher lokas (1-7) are described as the heavens, populated by higher gods, and full of truth. The lower lokas (8-14) constitute the different "hells". In each of these realms are different deities and beings 'living out their karmic trajectories". Those beings in the higher realms have attained a temporary spiritual liberation due to their positive merits for having strengthened their detachment to the mind, ego and sense objects. However, ultimate liberation (moksha) is regarded as the highest goal in human life, in which one achieves ultimate union with God. Moksha, in turn, requires total liberation/detachment from worldly objects and desires. 

Lokas:
 Satya-loka (Brahma-loka)
 Tapa-loka
 Jana-loka
 Mahar-loka
 Svar-loka (Svarga-loka)
 Bhuvar-loka
 Bhu-loka
 Atala-loka
 Vitala-loka
 Sutala-loka
 Talatala-loka
 Mahatala-loka
 Rasatala-loka
 Patala-loka
Another lineup of the fourteen lokas is stated as follows:

 Bhur-loka
 Bhuvar-loka
 Suvar-loka
 Mahar-loka
 Janar-loka
 Tapar-loka
 Satya-loka
 Brahma-loka
 Pitri-loka
 Soma-loka
 Indra-loka
 Gandharva-loka
 Rakshasa-loka
 Yaksha-loka

Gallery

Buddhism

Six lokas 

In the Tibetan and Tantric schools, "Six Lokas" refers to a Bönpo and Nyingmapa spiritual practice or discipline that works with chakras and the six dimensions or classes of beings in the Bhavachakra. In Buddhist cosmology, Kama-Loka, Rupa-Loka, Arupa-Loka are the realms that are inhabited by various beings. Additionally, those who inhabit these realms will identify with the characteristics of that realm. For example, a being that resides in Kama-loka experiences predominantly sensual desires, whereas a being in Rupa-loka will experience deep meditation. Various early suttas also suggest that there is a close relationship between psychology and cosmology, equating to different levels of existence in the cosmos, which can be interpreted as the afformentioned lokas.

Three lokas 

There is a cosmological view in Buddhism called Trailokya. In early Buddhism, based upon the Pali Canon and related Agamas, there are three distinct realms: First the Kama Loka, or the world of sensuality, in which humans, animals, and some devas reside, the second is Rupadhatu Loka, or the world of material existence, in which certain beings mastering specific meditative attainments reside, and the third is Arupadhatu Loka, or the immaterial, formless world, in which formless spirits reside. Arahants, who have attained the highest goal of Nirvana have unbound themselves from individual existence in any form, in any realm, and cannot be found here, there, or in between, i.e., they are found in no loka whatsoever. The early suttas also contain information regarding another important domain known as the supramundane realm, (lokottara/lokuttara 出世間, “beyond the world”), which is described as being experienced by awakened noble beings.

Jainism 

In Jain texts, the universe is referred to as loka. Jain cosmology postulates an eternal and ever-existing loka which works on universal natural laws, there being no creator and destroyer deity. According to the Jain cosmology, the universe is divided into three parts:
 Urdhva Loka -  the realms of the gods or heavens
 Madhya Loka – the realms of the humans, animals and plants
 Adho Loka – the realms of the hellish beings or the infernal regions
Jain cosmology uses the terms loka and aloka to describe the inhabitable and uninhabitable spaces in the universe. The philosophy describes how inhabitable space (loka) will never penetrate into the uninhabitable space (aloka) and vice versa, both of which are a subdivision of space (ākāśa). In Jain cosmology, on achieving moksha, the soul becomes free of the wordly realm once the fruits of all good and bad karmas have been received.

Theosophy 

The concept of lokas was adopted by Theosophy, and can be found in the writings of Blavatsky and G. de Purucker.  One of Blavatsky's three worlds are kamaloka (world of desires), which is like a temporary after-life state or an astral plane, according to the teachings of Blavatsky, Leadbeater, and Steiner.

References 

Hindu cosmology
Buddhist cosmology
Jain cosmology
Sanskrit words and phrases